Gornja Krčina is a village in the municipalities of Ugljevik (Republika Srpska) and Teočak, Bosnia and Herzegovina.

Demographics 
According to the 2013 census, its population was 168, all Serbs living in the Ugljevik part, thus none in the Teočak part.

References

Populated places in Teočak
Populated places in Ugljevik